Park Kyung-hoon (born 19 January 1961) is a South Korean football manager and former player. Park played for the South Korean national team in 1986 and 1990 FIFA World Cup. He also won the 1986 Asian Games with the national team.

Club career 
Born in the slum of Seoul, (Suyu-dong) Park had liked art originally, but he changed his career path to be a footballer due to his financial problem when becoming a high school student. He spent his professional career in POSCO Atoms, and won three titles in the K League. In the 1988 season, he was named the Most Valuable Player, but he thought that his teammate Lee Kee-keun should deserve the award. He wanted to return it, but the K League Federation rejected his decision.

In 1993, Park announced his retirement and left for England to study abroad. He also played for an English semi-professional club Yeading for a time, and became the first South Korean player to appear in the English FA Cup.

In 2013, K League Federation selected him as the right back of the 30th Anniversary Best XI.

Style of play 
Park is regarded as one of the greatest South Korean right backs of all time. Nicknamed the "Progenitor of Overlapping" in South Korea, he was the first South Korean full-back to actively take part in attack.

Career statistics

Club

International 

Results list South Korea's goal tally first.

Honours

Player 
Hanyang University
Korean National Championship: 1983

POSCO Atoms B
Korean National Championship runner-up: 1985

POSCO Atoms
K League 1: 1986, 1988, 1992

South Korea
Asian Games: 1986
AFC Asian Cup runner-up: 1988
Afro-Asian Cup of Nations: 1987
Dynasty Cup: 1990

Individual
Korean FA Best XI: 1981, 1984, 1985, 1986, 1987, 1988
AFC Asian All Stars: 1982
K League 1 Best XI: 1984, 1987
K League 1 Most Valuable Player: 1988
AFC Asian Cup Team of the Tournament: 1988
K League 30th Anniversary Best XI: 2013

Manager 
Individual
K League 1 Manager of the Year: 2010

References

External links
 
 Park Kyung-hoon – National Team Stats at KFA 
 
 
 Interview with Park Jyung Hoon, The Jeju Weekly, 13 November, 2010

1990 FIFA World Cup players
1988 AFC Asian Cup players
Footballers at the 1988 Summer Olympics
1986 FIFA World Cup players
1984 AFC Asian Cup players
Olympic footballers of South Korea
Pohang Steelers players
K League 1 Most Valuable Player Award winners
K League 1 players
Association football defenders
South Korea international footballers
South Korean footballers
1961 births
Living people
Asian Games medalists in football
Footballers at the 1986 Asian Games
Footballers at the 1990 Asian Games
Asian Games gold medalists for South Korea
Asian Games bronze medalists for South Korea
Medalists at the 1986 Asian Games
Medalists at the 1990 Asian Games
Yeading F.C. players
Footballers from Seoul